In September 2016, the International Union for Conservation of Nature (IUCN) listed 783 data deficient mammalian species. Of all evaluated mammalian species, 14% are listed as data deficient. 
The IUCN also lists 30 mammalian subspecies as data deficient.

Of the subpopulations of mammals evaluated by the IUCN, four species and/or subpopulations have been assessed as data deficient.

This is a complete list of data deficient mammalian species and subspecies evaluated by the IUCN. Species and subspecies which have data deficient subpopulations (or stocks) are indicated. Where possible common names for taxa are given while links point to the scientific name used by the IUCN.

Primates
There are 20 species and 26 subspecies of primate evaluated as data deficient.

Gibbons

Subspecies
Yunnan lar gibbon

Lemurs

Species

Subspecies
Ranomafana bamboo lemur

Tarsiers

Old World monkeys

Species
Osman Hill's mangabey
Subspecies

New World monkeys

Species

Subspecies

Cetartiodactyls
Cetartiodactyla includes dolphins, whales and even-toed ungulates. There are 61 species, one subspecies, and three subpopulations of cetartiodactyl evaluated as data deficient.

Non-cetacean even-toed ungulates

Cetaceans
There are 45 species, one subspecies, and three subpopulations of cetacean evaluated as data deficient.

Oceanic dolphins

Species

Subpopulations
Long-finned pilot whale (1 subpopulation)
Risso's dolphin (1 subpopulation)

Beaked whales

Species

Subpopulations
Cuvier's beaked whale (1 subpopulation)

Other cetaceans

Species

Subspecies
Pygmy blue whale

Marsupials

Carnivora

Species

Afrosoricida

Pilosa

Subpopulations
Silky anteater (1 subpopulation)

Eulipotyphla
There are 83 species in the order Eulipotyphla evaluated as data deficient.

Shrews

Erinaceids
Long-eared gymnure

Talpids

Lagomorpha

Rodents
There are 380 rodent species evaluated as data deficient.

Hystricomorpha
There are 82 species in Hystricomorpha evaluated as data deficient.

Tuco-tucos

Chinchilla rats

Dasyproctids

Neotropical spiny rat species

New World porcupines

Other Hystricomorpha species

Myomorpha
There are 245 species in Myomorpha evaluated as data deficient.

Murids

Cricetids

Nesomyids

Spalacids

Dipodids

Mouse-like hamsters
Noble mouse-like hamster
Tsolov's mouse-like hamster

Castorimorpha
Lined pocket mouse
Oaxacan pocket gopher

Sciuromorpha
There are 50 species in Sciuromorpha evaluated as data deficient.

Sciurids

Dormice

Anomaluromorpha
Pel's flying squirrel

Cingulata

Bats
There are 191 species and one subspecies of bat evaluated as data deficient.

Megabats

Microbats
There are 171 species and one subspecies of microbat evaluated as data deficient.

Old World leaf-nosed bats

Species

Subspecies
Philippine tailless leaf-nosed bat

Horseshoe bats

Vesper bats

Long-fingered bats

Sac-winged bats

Free-tailed bats

Leaf-nosed bats

Slit-faced bats

Mouse-tailed bats
Macinnes's mouse-tailed bat

Disc-winged bats
Thyroptera devivoi
LaVal's disk-winged bat

Elephant shrews

Treeshrews

See also 
 Lists of IUCN Red List data deficient species
 List of least concern mammals
 List of near threatened mammals
 List of vulnerable mammals
 List of endangered mammals
 List of critically endangered mammals
 List of recently extinct mammals

References 

Mammals
Data deficient mammals
Data deficient mammals